= Yopougon Stormwater Drain =

Stormwater drainage infrastructure in Yopougon, Côte d'Ivoire

The Yopougon Stormwater Drain is a stormwater drainage infrastructure project located in the commune of Yopougon, in Abidjan, Cote D' Ivoire.

The drainage works are being implemented under the Projet d’Assainissement et de Résilience Urbaine (PARU), a flood-management and urban resilience program supported by the Government of Côte d'Ivoire and the World Bank.

== Background ==
Yopougon has experienced recurrent flooding problems that have affected local populations and urban infrastructure.

According to World Bank infrastructure director Franz Drees-Gross, major flooding issues in the commune motivated the construction of new drainage infrastructure.

== Construction ==
In December 2024, officials from the World Bank visited the drainage construction site in Yopougon.

During the visit, Franz Drees-Gross stated that the project included a drainage canal measuring nearly four kilometres in length.

Project officials indicated that approximately 230,000 people could benefit from the improved drainage infrastructure and flood protection measures.
